Reagen Ivan Allen is a South African politician and previous comedian who  has been the Western Cape Provincial Minister of Community Safety and Police Oversight since April 2022 and a Member of the Western Cape Provincial Parliament for the Democratic Alliance (DA) since December 2018.

Life and career
Allen was born and grew up in Rocklands, Mitchells Plain on the Cape Flats in Cape Town. He initially began his career as a comedian. He  won the Cape Town Comedy Club's 2018 #yourfunnycider competition. and was nominated for a Comics Choice Award 2019.

Allen has obtained numerous qualifications in Public Relations and Paralegal Studies. He graduated from the DA's Young Leaders Programme in 2012. He studied at the Friedrich Naumann Foundation for Freedom in Germany, while he served as the DA's Youth National Media and Publicity chairperson.

In December 2018, he was sworn in as a Member of the Western Cape Provincial Parliament. He filled the vacancy created by the resignation of Dan Plato. He was elected to a full term as a Member of the Provincial Parliament in the 2019 elections and became Chairperson of the Standing Committee on Community Safety, Cultural Affairs and Sports.

On 22 April 2022, Mitchell was appointed by Alan Winde as the Provincial Minister of Community Safety and Police Oversight. He was officially sworn in as Provincial Minister on 26 April 2022 by Judge Babalwa Mantame.

References

External links
People's Assembly profile
Hon Reagen Allen

Year of birth missing (living people)
Living people
Members of the Western Cape Provincial Parliament
Democratic Alliance (South Africa) politicians